Aleksandr Kaidarashvili (born 2 November 1978 in Tbilisi) is a Georgian professional football player who is currently unattached.

1978 births
Living people
Footballers from Georgia (country)
Expatriate footballers from Georgia (country)
Expatriate footballers in Ukraine
Expatriate sportspeople from Georgia (country) in Ukraine
FC Kryvbas Kryvyi Rih players
FC Nyva Ternopil players
Ukrainian Premier League players
Georgia (country) international footballers
Association football forwards